The Infinity Tower is a  skyscraper by Meriton completed in 2014 at 43 Herschel Street Brisbane, Australia. It was the tallest building in Brisbane until it was surpassed by 1 William Street in 2016.

It contains 81 levels of serviced apartments and residential apartments totalling 549 units. It is situated on a relatively small site and is part of the North Quarter district of the Brisbane CBD. It is close to Roma Street railway station, King George Square, Queen Street Mall and the Treasury District. It is also close to the Kurilpa Bridge which gives access to South Bank Parklands and the Queensland Cultural Centre.

Facilities available to tenants includes a spa, lap pool, private gym, sauna and an efficient lift system.

Nearly two-thirds of the building's apartments had been sold as of February 2013.

Construction

Excavation began in November 2009 after Meriton purchased the site, which was formerly a ground level carpark, for A$25 million.

In March 2012, Meriton applied for permission from the federal Department of Infrastructure and Transport to operate a crane at a height of 311 m after the Brisbane City Council approved the addition of four storeys to the design.

The building was officially opened by Queensland Premier, Campbell Newman and Meriton boss, Harry Triguboff on 24 July 2013.
Levels 25 to 64 had been progressively completed from November 2013 and the overall construction was finished in early 2014.

See also

 List of tallest buildings in Brisbane
 List of tallest buildings in Australia

Construction Gallery

References

External links

Building at The Skyscraper Center database
Infinity Tower in AustralianPlanet

Skyscrapers in Brisbane
Residential skyscrapers in Australia
Apartment buildings in Brisbane
Brisbane central business district
Residential buildings completed in 2014
2014 establishments in Australia